Escape Or Die! was a Canadian reality television series produced by Farpoint Films that premiered in Canada in 2015 on OLN. Starring escape artist Dean Gunnarson, the series showed the behind-the-scenes preparations and escapes filmed in various locations around the world. The series featured Cary Tardi, Jeff Gunnarson, Ava Darrach-Gagnon, and John MacDonald as part of Dean's team that helped make the escapes happen and keep him safe. The show also featured appearances by magician and skeptic James Randi and Colombian magician Gustavo Lorgia.

The series won a Golden Sheaf Award at the 2016 Yorkton Film Festival for Best Documentary Series.

Personnel
 Dean Gunnarson - escape artist
 Cary Tardi - theatrics expert
 Jeff Gunnarson - safety expert
 Ava Darrach-Gagnon - office manager
 John MacDonald - blacksmith

Episodes

References

External links
 
 
 EOD on OLN 
 Dean Gunnarson

2010s Canadian reality television series
2010s Canadian documentary television series
2015 Canadian television series debuts
2015 Canadian television series endings
Canadian travel television series